Stoppeldijk is a former village in the Dutch province of Zeeland. Since 1970, it has been part of the village of Vogelwaarde.

Stoppeldijk was a separate municipality until 1936, when it was merged with Boschkapelle.

References

Former municipalities of Zeeland
Hulst